New Noise Designed by a Sadist is the sixth studio album by English industrial rock band Pop Will Eat Itself, released on 3 October 2011 by Cooking Vinyl. It was the band's first original studio album in over seventeen years, after Dos Dedos Mis Amigos (1994).

Musical style
New Noise Designed by a Sadist is said to "bear all the hallmarks" of the band's heyday. The best examples are said to be "Equal Zero", whose "buzzing guitar hooks, swirling techno bleeps, and clattering beats" have been said to "could have sat" alongside the band's 1994 collaboration with The Prodigy, "Their Law", and "Wasted (Pt. 1)", whose "snarling vocals, industrial riffs, and scuzzy guitars" are reminiscent of John Lydon's electronica work.

Track listing
All tracks composed by Crabbi (Graham Crabb); except where indicated
 "Back 2 Business"
 "Chaos & Mayhem" (Adam Mole, Fuzz Townshend)
 "Nosebleeder Turbo TV" (Adam Mole, Rice)
 "Captain Plastic"
 "Mask"
 "Equal Zero"
 "Oldskool Cool" (Mary Byker, Psychedelic Furs)
 "Seek & Destroy" (Adam Mole)
 "Disguise"
 "Wasted" (Part 1) (David Nahmani)
 "Wasted" (Reprise)

Personnel
Graham Crabb - vocals, guitar, programming
Mary Byker - vocals
Rob Holliday - additional guitar and bass
Tim Muddiman - bass
Jason Bowld - drums
Steve Monti - additional programming
Leif Kahal - guitar, end solo on "Oldskool Cool"
David Nahmani - additional programming on "Wasted" (Part 1)

References

Pop Will Eat Itself albums
2011 albums
Cooking Vinyl albums